This is the list of Egyptian Premier League hat-tricks.

Note
(H) – Home ; (A) – Away

References

Egyptian Premier League
Association football in Egypt lists
Egyptian Premier League